The 1957–58 season was FC Steaua București's 10th season since its founding in 1947.

Divizia A

League table

Results 

Source:

Cupa României

Results

European Cup

First round

Danube Cup

Round of 16

See also

 1957–58 Cupa României
 1957–58 Divizia A
 1957–58 European Cup
 1958 Danube Cup

Notes and references

External links
 1957–58 FC Steaua București Divizia A matches

FC Steaua București seasons
1957–58 in Romanian football
Steaua, București
Steaua